In Canada, the federal government and all provinces and territories have enacted legislation setting fixed election dates so that elections occur on a more regular timeline (usually every four years) and the date of a forthcoming election is publicly known. However, the governor general, the provincial lieutenant governors, and the territorial commissioners still have the constitutional power to call a general election on the advice of the relevant first minister at any point before the fixed date. By-elections, used to fill vacancies in a legislature, are also not affected by fixed election dates.

Federal
Section 50 of the Constitution Act, 1867 and section 4 of the Canadian Charter of Rights and Freedoms limit the maximum life of a federal parliament to five years following the return of the writs of election from the previous general election. Section 5 of the Charter provides that there must be sittings of each legislative assembly at least once in every twelve-month period. By constitutional convention, an election must be called by the governor general following the mandatory dissolution of parliament.

The 39th Canadian Parliament passed An Act to Amend the Canada Elections Act, which received Royal Assent on May 3, 2007. It requires that each general election take place on the third Monday in October in the fourth calendar year after the previous poll, starting with October 19, 2009. During the legislative process, the Liberal-dominated Senate added an amendment listing conditions under which an election date could be modified, in order to avoid clashes with religious holidays, municipal elections, and referendums, but the House of Commons, led by Prime Minister Stephen Harper's Conservatives, rejected the amendment and the Senate did not pursue it.

When introducing the legislation, Harper stated that "fixed election dates prevent governments from calling snap elections for short-term political advantage. They level the playing field for all parties and the rules are clear for everybody." However, despite the amendments to the legislation, the prime minister is still free to request an election at any time. As the amendments to the Canada Elections Act clearly state "Nothing in this section affects the powers of the Governor General, including the power to dissolve Parliament at the Governor General's discretion", the change effectively altered only the maximum duration of a parliament by ensuring that it ends no later than October of the fourth calendar year after its commencement, while leaving the possibility of an earlier end unaffected.

This situation was illustrated by the dissolution of parliament at Prime Minister Harper's request on September 7, 2008. This led Democracy Watch to initiate proceedings in federal court against the Crown-in-Council, the Prime Minister of Canada, and the Governor General of Canada, challenging the decision to call an election prior to the fixed election date. Judge Michel M. J. Shore dismissed the matter, saying the applicants who launched the suit "do not demonstrate a proper understanding of the separation of powers," since "[t]he remedy for the applicant's contention is not for the Federal Court to decide, but rather one of the count of the ballot box". The court effectively found that the fixed election dates were not binding on the prime minister or legally enforceable by the courts.

With elections being held in October 2008 (after an early election call) and May 2011 (after a vote of non-confidence on a contempt of Parliament motion), the 41st parliament was the first to reach its maximum life under the revised law.

The laws enabling fixed election dates, both federally and in the provinces and territories, are established by simple majority votes, and so any fixed election date could similarly be extended or abolished by another majority vote by the applicable Parliament or legislative assembly. However, they would not have authority to override the constitutional 5-year limit; the notwithstanding clause does not apply to Sections 3, 4 or 5 of the Charter which govern these processes.

Provincial

Alberta
The Legislature of Alberta, under a Progressive Conservative majority government, passed the Election Amendment Act, 2011, on December 8, 2011. It provided that a general election would be held between March 1 and May 31, 2012, and after that, in the same three-month period in the fourth calendar year after a general election. Further amendments enacted by Jason Kenney's United Conservative government in 2021 eliminated the 3 month period and fixed the precise date of the election on the last Monday of May.

British Columbia
British Columbia was the first jurisdiction in Canada to adopt fixed election dates, doing so in 2001.  The legislation amended the Constitution Act of British Columbia to require an election on May 17, 2005, and the second Tuesday in May every four years thereafter. In October 2017, the legislature passed amendments to the Constitution Act that changed the fixed election date from the second Tuesday of May to the third Saturday of October.

Manitoba
The Legislative Assembly of Manitoba passed acts in 2008 so as to stipulate that an election will be held on the first Tuesday in October in the fourth calendar year after election day; the first was in October 2011. The act also includes a provision to move the election if, as of January 1 of the election year, the election period would otherwise overlap with a federal election period; the provincial election is to be postponed until the third Tuesday of the following April.

New Brunswick
New Brunswick amended the Legislative Assembly Act in 2007 to introduce fixed election dates, causing an election to be held every four years, on the fourth Monday in September, the first was September 2010. The act was amended again in 2017 to change the fixed election date to the third Monday in October in the fourth calendar year following the last election.

Newfoundland and Labrador
The Legislative Assembly of Newfoundland and Labrador, with a majority held by the Progressive Conservative Party headed by Danny Williams, passed legislation in 2004, fixing the date of elections in Newfoundland and Labrador. General elections in the province are required to be held on the second Tuesday in October every four years, the first fixed date election occurred on October 9, 2007. In the event that a premier leaves office while the legislature is summoned, the new premier is required to, within 12 months of being appointed, advise the lieutenant governor to call an election.

Nova Scotia
Under Section 29A of the Elections Act, general elections in Nova Scotia are held on the third Tuesday in July in the fourth year following the date of the previous election.

Nova Scotia was the last province to introduce fixed-election-date legislation. Following the 2021 provincial election, premier Tim Houston promised to implement fixed election date legislation. On October 13, 2021, Houston introduced a bill in the House of Assembly to  propose amendments to the Elections Act, requiring the province to hold elections every four years, on the third Tuesday of July, with the first date being set for July 15, 2025.

Ontario
In Ontario, the legislature, with a majority held by Dalton McGuinty's Liberals, passed the Election Statute Law Amendment Act, 2005, which requires elections to be held on the first Thursday in October every four years, starting with 2007. However, the act does not prevent the Lieutenant Governor of Ontario from dissolving the legislature "when the Lieutenant Governor sees fit". The law also allows the date to be moved forward to any of the seven days following the first Thursday of October in the case of religious or culturally significant holidays: the 2007 election was moved from October 4 to 10 to avoid the Jewish holiday of Shemini Atzeret. As of December 2016, the Elections Act was amended, scheduling all subsequent provincial elections for "the first Thursday in June in the fourth calendar year following polling day in the most recent general election". This amendment will result in the next provincial election occurring on June 4, 2026.

Prince Edward Island
In 2007, Pat Binns' Progressive Conservatives (PCs) introduced a bill for fixed election dates, but an election was called before the bill could pass the legislature. Since the PCs had previously defeated a similar Liberal motion in 2006, Robert Ghiz, then leader of the opposition, said, "if they [the Progressive Conservatives] were concerned about accountability and fixed election dates they would have voted a year ago to have a fixed election date set for this election. They chose not to do that." However, when the Liberal Party held a majority in the legislative assembly, an act was in 2008 passed to amend the election act, mandating an election would be held every four years on the first Monday in October.

Quebec
The Quebec legislature passed a bill which received Royal Assent on June 14, 2013, that establishes fixed election dates held on the first Monday in October of the fourth calendar year following the dissolution of the legislature. It also includes a provision to move the election to the first Monday of April in the fifth year, if the election period overlaps with a federal or municipal election period.

Had the National Assembly not been dissolved earlier and the federal and municipal elections remained as scheduled, the first fixed date election would have been held on October 3, 2016. However, on March 5, 2014, just over 18 months after the previous election, the assembly was dissolved by Lieutenant Governor Pierre Duchesne at the request of Premier Pauline Marois, who headed a minority government. This means that the first fixed date election was held on Monday, October 1, 2018.

Saskatchewan
The Saskatchewan Legislature amended The Legislative Assembly and Executive Council Act in 2007 so as to stipulate that an election will be held on the last Monday of October in the fourth calendar year following the previous election in 2018 from the previous requirement wherein the election was to be held on the first Monday of November in the fourth calendar year following the previous election; the first fixed election was in November 2011. The act also includes a provision to move the election if the election period would otherwise overlap with a federal election period; the provincial election is to be postponed until the first Monday of the following April.

Territorial

Northwest Territories
The Northwest Territories' Elections and Plebiscite Act requires elections on the first Tuesday in October every four years, starting with 2007. A strong motivation for this law was the practical difficulties of holding an election during the Arctic winter.

Nunavut
The date for the 4th Nunavut general election, held in 2013, was set almost a year prior. The following year the legislative assembly amended the Nunavut Elections Act to mandate an election be held on the last Monday in October in the fourth calendar year following the previous election day. The first election to be held under these rules took place October 30, 2017.

Yukon
Under Section 50.01 of the Elections Act, elections in Yukon are scheduled for the first Monday of November in the fourth year following the date of the previous election.

Yukon was the last territory to introduce fixed election date legislation. While campaigning in 2016 the Yukon Liberal Party, and leader Sandy Silver, promised fixed election dates amongst other electoral reform. Amendments to the territory's  Elections Act providing for fixed election dates were passed in December 2020, and came into effect following the 2021 Yukon general election.

Next elections
Assuming that a government does not fall on a non-confidence vote and that the prime minister or premier does not request an early election, the fixed election date legislation requires the next election for each jurisdiction to be held on the following dates:

References

External links
Parliament of Canada: Fixed-date elections in Canada

Elections in Canada